Walter Cook Caves Ecological Reserve is an ecological reserve located north of Grand Rapids, Manitoba, Canada. It was established in 2001 under the Manitoba Ecological Reserves Act.

See also
 List of ecological reserves in Manitoba
 List of protected areas of Manitoba

References

External links
 Walter Cook Caves Ecological Reserve, Backgrounder
 iNaturalist: Walter Cook Caves Ecological Reserve

Protected areas established in 2001
Ecological reserves of Manitoba
Nature reserves in Manitoba
Protected areas of Manitoba